Sugie is a Japanese surname. Notable people with the surname include:

 Atsushi Sugie, Japanese astronomer and a discoverer of minor planets
3957 Sugie, minor planet
 Toshio Sugie (1913–1996), Japanese film director

Japanese-language surnames